William Gerald Ratner (born February 25, 1947) is an American voice actor, author and solo performance artist. He is best known as the voice of Flint in Hasbro's syndicated TV cartoon G.I. Joe.

Career 
Ratner is best known as the voice of Flint in Hasbro's syndicated TV cartoon G.I. Joe. His voice was used in numerous movie trailers, including Inside Out, Will Ferrell's Talladega Nights and Blades of Glory, Kung Fu Panda, Mike Myers's The Love Guru, Monsters vs. Aliens, and many more. He narrates documentaries on Discovery Channel, A&E, The Weather Channel, History, and others. His voice is on Kings Quest, Grand Theft Auto IV, Mass Effect,  and others, and he is the narrator in episodes of Ben 10 for the Cartoon Network. Ratner is also a voice-over announcer for television stations across the US.

His book, Parenting for the Digital Age: The Truth behind Media's Effect on Children and What To Do About It, winner of the National Indie Excellence Award and a Next Generation Indie Book Award and Eric Hoffer Award finalist, is published by Familius. His personal essays are published in the Baltimore Review, Blue Lake Review and The Missouri Review.

Ratner's performances of his personal essays are featured on KCRW's Strangers and National Public Radio's The Business. and Good Food. He tours nationally for storytelling conferences, and festivals, is a regular competitor in The Moth Story Slams in Los Angeles, is a nine-time Moth StorySLAM Winner, a National Storytelling Festival Story Slam teller-Jonesborough TN, a National Storytelling Network storyteller.

He is a contributing author of the book Secrets of Voiceover Success. He is a two-time winner of "Best of the Hollywood Fringe Festival Extension" – Solo Category for "Bobbywood: Whatever Happened to Bobby the Bellboy?" in 2013 and Voices in my Head: A Life. He is a member of Actors Equity Association, and Screen Actors Guild-American Federation of TV & Radio Artists (SAG-AFTRA) where he teaches voiceover.

Filmography

Film

Television

Video games

References

External links 

1947 births
Living people
Male actors from Saint Paul, Minnesota
American male voice actors
Radio and television announcers
20th-century American male actors
21st-century American male actors
Male actors from Los Angeles
Writers from Saint Paul, Minnesota
American male essayists
20th-century American essayists
21st-century American essayists
20th-century American male writers
21st-century American male writers